Early modern Europe, also referred to as the post-medieval period, is the period of European history between the end of the Middle Ages and the beginning of the Industrial Revolution, roughly the late 15th century to the late 18th century. Historians variously mark the beginning of the early modern period with the invention of moveable type printing in the 1450s, the Fall of Constantinople and end of the Hundred Years’ War in 1453, the end of the Wars of the Roses in 1485, the beginning of the High Renaissance in Italy in the 1490s, the end of the Reconquista and subsequent voyages of Christopher Columbus to the Americas in 1492, or the start of the Protestant Reformation in 1517. The precise dates of its end point also vary and are usually linked with either the start of the French Revolution in 1789 or with the more vaguely defined beginning of the Industrial Revolution in late 18th century England.

Some of the more notable trends and events of the early modern period included the Reformation and the religious conflicts it provoked (including the French Wars of Religion and the Thirty Years' War), the rise of capitalism and modern nation states, widespread witch hunts and European colonization of the Americas.

Characteristics 
The modern period was characterized by profound changes in many realms of human endeavor. Among the most important include the development of science as a formalized practice, increasingly rapid technological progress, and the establishment of secularized civic politics, law courts and the nation state.  Capitalist economies began to develop in a nascent form, first in the northern Italian republics such as Genoa and Venice as well as in the cities of the Low Countries, and later in France, Germany and England. The early modern period also saw the rise and dominance of the economic theory of mercantilism. As such, the early modern period is often associated with the decline and eventual disappearance (at least in Western Europe) of feudalism and serfdom.  The Protestant Reformation greatly altered the religious balance of Christendom, creating a formidable new opposition to the dominance of the Catholic Church, especially in Northern Europe. The early modern period also witnessed the circumnavigation of the Earth and the establishment of regular European contact with the Americas and South and East Asia. The ensuing rise of global systems of international economic, cultural and intellectual exchange played an important role in the development of capitalism and represents the earliest phase of globalization.

Periodization 

Regardless of the precise dates used to define its beginning and end points, the early modern period is generally agreed to have comprised the Renaissance, the Reformation, the Scientific Revolution, and the Enlightenment. As such, historians have attributed a number of fundamental changes to the period, notably the increasingly rapid progress of science and technology, the secularization of politics, and the diminution of the absolute authority of the Roman Catholic Church as well as the lessening of the influence of all faiths upon national governments. Many historians have identified the early modern period as the epoch in which individuals began to think of themselves as belonging to a national polity—a notable break from medieval modes of self-identification, which had been largely based upon religion (belonging to a universal Christendom), language, or feudal allegiance (belonging to the manor or extended household of a particular magnate or lord). 

The beginning of the early modern period is not clear-cut, but is generally accepted to be in the late 15th century or early 16th century. Significant dates in this transitional phase from medieval to early modern Europe can be noted:

 1450: The invention of the first European movable type printing process by Johannes Gutenberg, a device that fundamentally changed the circulation of information. Movable type, which allowed individual characters to be arranged to form words and which is an invention separate from the printing press, had been invented earlier in China.

 1453: The conquest of Constantinople by the Ottomans signalled the end of the Byzantine empire; the Battle of Castillon concluded the Hundred Years' War.

 1485: The last Plantagenet king of England, Richard III, was killed at Bosworth and the medieval civil wars of aristocratic factions gave way to early modern Tudor monarchy, in the person of Henry VII.

 1492: The first documented European voyage to the Americas by the Genoese explorer Christopher Columbus; the end of the Reconquista, with the final expulsion of the Moors from the Iberian Peninsula; the Spanish government expels the Jews.

 1494: French king Charles VIII invaded Italy, drastically altering the status quo and beginning a series of wars which would punctuate the Italian Renaissance.

 1513: First formulation of modern politics with the publication of Machiavelli's The Prince.

 1517: The Reformation begins with Martin Luther nailing his ninety-five theses to the door of the church in Wittenberg, Germany.

 1526: Ferdinand I, Holy Roman Emperor gains the crowns of Bohemia and Hungary.

 1545: The Council of Trent begins Counter-Reformation and marks the end of the medieval Roman Catholic Church.
The end date of the early modern period is variously associated with the Industrial Revolution, which began in Britain in about 1750, or the beginning of the French Revolution in 1789, which drastically transformed the state of European politics and ushered in the Napoleonic Era and modern Europe.

The role of nobles in the Feudal System had yielded to the notion of the Divine Right of Kings during the Middle Ages (in fact, this consolidation of power from the land-owning nobles to the titular monarchs was one of the most prominent themes of the Middle Ages). Among the most notable political changes included the abolition of serfdom and the crystallization of kingdoms into nation-states. Perhaps even more significantly, with the advent of the Reformation, the notion of Christendom as a unified political entity was destroyed. Many kings and rulers used this radical shift in the understanding of the world to further consolidate their sovereignty over their territories. For instance, many of the Germanic states (as well as English Reformation) converted to Protestantism in an attempt to slip out of the grasp of the Pope.

The intellectual developments of the period included the creation of the economic theory of mercantilism and the publication of enduringly influential works of political and social philosophy, such as Machiavelli's The Prince (1513) and Thomas More's Utopia (1515).

Reformation 

The Protestant Reformation was a reform-oriented schism from the Roman Catholic Church initiated by Martin Luther and continued by John Calvin, Huldrych Zwingli, and other early Protestant Reformers. It is typically dated from 1517, lasting until the end of the Thirty Years' War (1618–1648) with the Peace of Westphalia in 1648. It was launched on 31 October 1517 by Martin Luther, who posted his 95 Theses criticizing the practice of indulgences to the door of the Castle Church in Wittenberg, Germany, commonly used to post notices to the University community. It was very widely publicized across Europe and caught fire. Luther began by criticizing the sale of indulgences, insisting that the Pope had no authority over purgatory and that the Catholic doctrine of the merits of the saints had no foundation in the gospel. The Protestant position, however, would come to incorporate doctrinal changes such as sola scriptura and sola fide.

The Reformation ended in division and the establishment of new church movements. The four most important traditions to emerge directly from the Reformation were Lutheranism, the Reformed (also called Calvinist or Presbyterian) tradition, Anglicanism, and the Anabaptists. Subsequent Protestant churches generally trace their roots back to these initial four schools of the Reformation. It also led to the Catholic or Counter Reformation within the Roman Catholic Church through a variety of new spiritual movements, reforms of religious communities, the founding of seminaries, the clarification of Catholic theology as well as structural changes in the institution of the Church.

The largest Protestant groups were the Lutherans and Calvinists. Lutheran churches were founded mostly in Germany, the Baltics and Scandinavia, while the Reformed ones were founded in Switzerland, Hungary, France, the Netherlands and Scotland.

The initial movement within Germany diversified, and other reform impulses arose independently of Luther. The availability of the printing press provided the means for the rapid dissemination of religious materials in the vernacular.  The core motivation behind the Reformation was theological, though many other factors played a part, including the rise of nationalism, the Western Schism that eroded faith in the Papacy, the perceived corruption of the Roman Curia, the impact of humanism, and the new learning of the Renaissance that questioned much traditional thought.

There were also reformation movements throughout continental Europe known as the Radical Reformation, which gave rise to the Anabaptist, Moravian and other Pietistic movements.

The Roman Catholic Church responded with a Counter-Reformation initiated by the Council of Trent. Much work in battling Protestantism was done by the well-organised new order of the Jesuits. In general, Northern Europe, with the exception of most of Ireland, came under the influence of Protestantism. Southern Europe remained Roman Catholic, while Central Europe was a site of a fierce conflict, culminating in the Thirty Years' War, which left it devastated.

Church of England 

The Reformation reshaped the Church of England decisively after 1547. The separation of the Church of England (or Anglican Church) from Rome under Henry VIII, beginning in 1529 and completed in 1537, brought England alongside this broad Reformation movement; however, religious changes in the English national church proceeded more conservatively than elsewhere in Europe. Reformers in the Church of England alternated, for decades, between sympathies for ancient Catholic tradition and more Reformed principles, gradually developing, within the context of robustly Protestant doctrine, a tradition considered a middle way (via media) between the Roman Catholic and Protestant traditions.

Consequences of the Protestant Reformation 
The following outcomes of the Protestant Reformation regarding human capital formation, the Protestant ethic, economic development, governance, and "dark" outcomes have been identified by scholars.

Historiography 
Margaret C. Jacob argues that there has been a dramatic shift in the historiography of the Reformation.  Until the 1960s, historians focused their attention largely on the great leaders and also the theologians of the 16th century, especially Luther, Calvin, and Zwingli.  Their ideas were studied in depth. However, the rise of the new social history in the 1960s look at history from the bottom up, not from the top down. Historians began to concentrate on the values, beliefs and behavior of the people at large. She finds, "in contemporary scholarship, the Reformation was then seen as a vast cultural upheaval, a social and popular movement and textured and rich because of its diversity."

Age of Enlightenment

The Age of Enlightenment refers to the 18th century in European philosophy, and is often thought of as part of a period which includes the Age of Reason. The term also more specifically refers to a historical intellectual movement, The Enlightenment. This movement advocated rationality as a means to establish an authoritative system of aesthetics, ethics, and logic.  The intellectual leaders of this movement regarded themselves as a courageous elite, and regarded their purpose as one of leading the world toward progress and out of a long period of doubtful tradition, full of irrationality, superstition, and tyranny, which they believed began during a historical period they called the Dark Ages.  This movement also provided a framework for the American and French Revolutions, the Latin American independence movement, and the Polish–Lithuanian Commonwealth Constitution of May 3, and also led to the rise of liberalism and the birth of socialism and communism.  It is matched by the high baroque and classical eras in music, and the neo-classical period in the arts, and receives contemporary application in the unity of science movement which includes logical positivism.

Difference between 'early modern' and the Renaissance 
The expression "early modern" is sometimes used as a substitute for the term Renaissance, and vice versa. However, "Renaissance" is properly used in relation to a diverse series of cultural developments; which occurred over several hundred years in many different parts of Europe—especially central and northern Italy—and span the transition from late Medieval civilization and the opening of the early modern period.

The term early modern is most often applied to Europe, and its overseas empire.  However, it has also been employed in the history of the Ottoman Empire. In the historiography of Japan, the Edo period from 1590 to 1868 is also sometimes referred to as the early modern period.

Diplomacy and warfare 

The 17th century saw very little peace in Europe – major wars were fought in 95 years (every year except 1610, 1669 to 1671, and 1680 to 1682.)   The wars were unusually ugly. Europe in the late 17th century, 1648 to 1700, was an age of great intellectual, scientific, artistic and cultural achievement.  Historian Frederick Nussbaum says it was:
prolific in genius, in common sense, and in organizing ability.  It could properly have been expected that intelligence, comprehension and high purpose would be applied to the control of human relations in general and to the relations between states and peoples in particular. The fact was almost completely opposite.  It was a period of marked unintelligence, immorality and frivolity in the conduct of international relations, marked by wars undertaken for dimly conceived purposes, waged with the utmost brutality and conducted by reckless betrayals of allies.

The worst came during the Thirty Years' War, 1618–1648, which had an extremely negative impact on the civilian population of Germany and surrounding areas, with massive loss of life and disruption of the economy and society.

Thirty Years' War: 1618–1648 

The Reformation led to a series of religious wars that culminated in the Thirty Years' War (1618–1648), which devastated much of Germany, killing between 25% and 40% of its entire population. Roman Catholic House of Habsburg and its allies fought against the Protestant princes of Germany, supported at various times by Denmark, Sweden and France. The Habsburgs, who ruled Spain, Austria, the Crown of Bohemia, Hungary, Slovene Lands, the Spanish Netherlands and much of Germany and Italy, were staunch defenders of the Roman Catholic Church. Some historians believe that the era of the Reformation came to a close when Roman Catholic France allied itself with Protestant states against the Habsburg dynasty. For the first time since the days of Martin Luther, political and national convictions again outweighed religious convictions in Europe.

Two main tenets of the Peace of Westphalia, which ended the Thirty Years' War, were:

 All parties would now recognise the Peace of Augsburg of 1555, by which each prince would have the right to determine the religion of his own state, the options being Roman Catholicism, Lutheranism, and now Calvinism (the principle of cuius regio, eius religio).
 Christians living in principalities where their denomination was not the established church were guaranteed the right to practice their faith in public during allotted hours and in private at their will.

The treaty also effectively ended the Papacy's pan-European political power. Pope Innocent X declared the treaty "null, void, invalid, iniquitous, unjust, damnable, reprobate, inane, empty of meaning and effect for all times" in his bull Zelo Domus Dei. European sovereigns, Roman Catholic and Protestant alike, ignored his verdict.

Scholars taking a "realist" perspective on wars and diplomacy have emphasized the Peace of Westphalia (1648) as a dividing line. It ended the Thirty Years War (1618–1648), where religion and ideology had been powerful motivating forces for warfare.   Westphalia, in the realist view, ushered in a new international system of sovereign states of roughly equal strength, dedicated not to ideology or religion but to enhance status, and territorial gains. The Catholic Church, for example, no longer devoted its energies to the very difficult task of reclaiming dioceses lost to Protestantism, but to build large-scale missions in overseas colonial possessions that could convert the natives by the thousands Using devoted members of society such as the Jesuits. According to Hamish Scott, the realist model assumes that "foreign policies were guided entirely by "Realpolitik," by the resulting struggle for resources and, eventually, by the search for what became known as a 'balance of power.'

Diplomacy before 1700 was not well developed, and chances to avoid wars were too often squandered.  In England, for example, King Charles II paid little attention to diplomacy, which proved disastrous.  During the Dutch war of 1665–67, England had no diplomats stationed in Denmark or Sweden.  When King Charles realized he needed them as allies, he sent special missions that were uninformed about local political, military, and diplomatic situations, and were ignorant of personalities and political factionalism.  Ignorance produced a series of blunders that ruined their efforts to find allies. King Louis XIV of France, by contrast, developed the most sophisticated diplomatic service, with permanent ambassadors and lesser ministers in major and minor capitals, all preparing steady streams of information and advice to Paris. Diplomacy became a career that proved highly attractive to rich senior aristocrats who enjoyed very high society at royal courts, especially because they carried the status of the most powerful nation in Europe. Increasingly, other nations copied the French model; French became the language of diplomacy, replacing Latin.  By 1700, the British and the Dutch, with small land armies, large navies, and large treasuries, used astute diplomacy to build alliances, subsidizing as needed land powers to fight on their side, or as in the case of the Hessians, hiring regiments of soldiers from mercenary princes in small countries. The balance of power was very delicately calculated, so that winning a battle here was worth the slice of territory there, with no regard to the wishes of the inhabitants.  Important peacemaking conferences at Utrecht (1713), Vienna (1738), Aix-la-Chapelle (1748) and Paris (1763) had a cheerful, cynical, game-like atmosphere in which professional diplomats cashed in victories like casino chips in exchange for territory.

Major states

Holy Roman Empire
Since 1512, the Holy Roman Empire was also known as the Holy Roman Empire of the German nation. The Habsburg House of Austria held the position of Holy Roman Emperors since the mid-1400s and for the entire Early modern period. Despite the lack of a centralized political structure in a period in which national monarchies were emerging, the Habsburg Emperors of the Early modern period came close to form a universal monarchy in Western Europe.

The Habsburgs expanded their control within and outside the Holy Roman Empire as a result of the dynastic policy pursued by Maximilian I, Holy Roman Emperor. Maximilian I married Mary of Burgundy, thus bringing the Burgundian Netherlands into the Habsburg inheritance. Their son, Philip the Handsome, married Joanna the Mad of Spain (daughter of Ferdinand II of Aragon and Isabella of Castile). Charles V, Holy Roman Emperor (son of Philip and Joanna) inherited the Habsburg Netherlands in 1506, Habsburg Spain and its territories in 1516, and Habsburg Austria in 1519.

The main opponents of the Habsburg Empire were the Ottoman Empire and the Kingdom of France. The Habsburgs clashed with France in a series of Italian wars. The Battle of Pavia (1525) initiated the Habsburg primacy in Italy and the replacement of France as the main European power. Nevertheless, religious wars forced Charles V to abdicate in 1556 and divide the Habsburg possessions between Spain and Austria. The next Holy Roman Emperor Ferdinand I completed the Council of Trent and maintained Germany at peace until the Thirty Years' War (1618–1648). The Habsburgs controlled the elective monarchies of Hungary and Bohemia as well, and eventually turned these states into hereditary domains.

Spain 

In 1492 the Catholic Monarchs of Castile and Aragon funded Christopher Columbus's plan to sail west to reach the Indies by crossing the Atlantic. He landed on a continent uncharted by Europeans and seen as a new world, the Americas. To prevent conflict between Portugal and Castile (the crown under which Columbus made the voyage), the Treaty of Tordesillas was signed dividing the world into two regions of exploration, where each had exclusive rights to claim newly discovered lands.

The structure of the Spanish Empire was established under the Spanish Habsburgs (1516–1700) and under the Spanish Bourbon monarchs, the empire was brought under greater crown control and increased its revenues from the Indies. The crown's authority in The Indies was enlarged by the papal grant of powers of patronage, giving it power in the religious sphere.

Under Philip II of Spain, Spain, rather than the Habsburg empire, was identified as a more powerful nation than France and England globally. Furthermore, despite attacks from other European states, Spain retained its position of dominance with apparent ease. Spain controlled the Netherlands until the Dutch revolt, and important states in southern Italy. The Spanish claims to Naples and Sicily dated back to the 15th century, but had been marred by rival claims until the mid-16th century and the rule of Philip II. There would be no Italian revolts against Spanish rule until 1647. The death of the Ottoman emperor Suleiman the Magnificent in 1566 and the naval victory over the Ottoman Empire at the Battle of Lepanto in 1571 cemented the status of Spain as a superpower in Europe and the world. The Spanish Empire comprised territories and colonies of the Spanish Monarch in the Americas, Asia (Spanish Philippines), Europe and some territories in Africa and Oceania.

France 

The Ancien Régime (French for "old regime") was the political and social system of the Kingdom of France from about 1450 until the French Revolution that started in  1789. The Ancien Régime was ruled by the late Valois and Bourbon dynasties.  Much of the medieval political centralization of France had been lost in the Hundred Years' War, and the Valois Dynasty's attempts at re-establishing control over the scattered political centres of the country were hindered by the Wars of Religion). Much of the reigns of Henry IV, Louis XIII and the early years of Louis XIV were focused on administrative centralisation. Despite, however, the notion of "absolute monarchy" (typified by the king's right to issue lettres de cachet) and the efforts by the kings to create a centralized state, Ancien Régime France remained a country of systemic irregularities: administrative (including taxation), legal, judicial, and ecclesiastic divisions and prerogatives frequently overlapped, while the French nobility struggled to maintain their own rights in the matters of local government and justice, and powerful internal conflicts (like the Fronde) protested against this centralization.

The need for centralization in this period was directly linked to the question of royal finances and the ability to wage war. The internal conflicts and dynastic crises of the 16th and 17th centuries (the wars between Catholics and Protestants and the Habsburg's internal family conflict) and the territorial expansion of France in the 17th century demanded great sums which needed to be raised through taxes, such as the land tax and the tax on salt and by contributions of men and service from the nobility. The key to this centralization was the replacing of personal patronage systems organized around the king and other nobles by institutional systems around the state. The creation of intendants—representatives of royal power in the provinces—did much to undermine local control by regional nobles. The same was true of the greater reliance shown by the royal court on the "noblesse de robe" as judges and royal counselors. The creation of regional parlements had initially the same goal of facilitating the introduction of royal power into newly assimilated territories, but as the parlements gained in self-assurance, they began to be sources of disunity.

England

This period refers to England 1558–1603. The Elizabethan Era is the period associated with the reign of Queen Elizabeth I (1558–1603) and was a golden age in English cultural history. It was the height of the English Renaissance, and saw the flowering of English literature and poetry. This was also the time during which Elizabethan theatre grew.  William Shakespeare, among others, composed highly innovative and powerful plays. It was an age of expansion and exploration abroad. At home the Protestant Reformation was established and successfully defended against the Catholic powers of Spain and France.

The Jacobean era was the reign  James I of England (1603–1625). Overseas exploration and establishment of trading factories sped up, with the first permanent settlements in North America at Jamestown, Virginia in 1607, in Newfoundland in 1610, and at Plymouth Colony in Massachusetts in 1620. One king now ruled England and Scotland; the latter was fully absorbed by the Acts of Union 1707.

The tumultuous Caroline era was the reign of King Charles I (1625–1645), followed by his beheading by Oliver Cromwell's regime  in 1649 . The Caroline era was dominated by the growing religious, political, and social conflict between the King and his supporters, termed the Royalist party, and the Puritan opposition that evolved in response to particular aspects of Charles' rule. The colonization of North America continued apace, with new colonies in Maryland (1634), Connecticut (1635), and Rhode Island (1636).

Papacy 
The papacy continued to exercise significant diplomatic influence during the Early modern period. The Popes were frequently assembling Holy Leagues to assert Catholic supremacy in Europe. During the Renaissance, Julius II and Paul III were largely involved in the Italian Wars and worked to preserve their primacy among the Italian princes. During the Counter-Reformation, the Papacy supported Catholic powers and factions all over Europe. Pope Pius V assembled the Catholic coalition that won the Battle of Lepanto against the Turks. Pope Sixtus V sided with the Catholics during the French wars of religion. Worldwide religious missions, such as the Jesuit China mission, were established by Pope Gregory XIII. Gregory XIII is also responsible for the establishment of the Gregorian calendar. Following the Peace of Westphalia and the birth of nation-states, Papal claims to universal authority came effectively to an end.

Other political powers 
 Ottoman Empire
 Early Modern Italy
 Papal States
 Republic of Florence, Duchy of Florence, Grand Duchy of Tuscany
 Republic of Venice
 Duchy of Milan
 Republic of Genoa
 Kingdom of Naples
 Kingdom of Portugal
 Dutch Republic
 Holy Roman Empire
 Kingdom of Bohemia (Czech)
 Habsburg monarchy (Austria)
 Early Modern Germany
 Duchy of Prussia, Kingdom of Prussia
 Duchy of Bavaria, Electorate of Bavaria
 Electorate of the Palatinate
 Tsardom of Russia, Russian Empire
 Early Modern Sweden
 Denmark–Norway
 Early Modern Romania
 Polish–Lithuanian Commonwealth
 Kingdom of Hungary

See also
 Renaissance
 International relations 1648–1814
 Early Modern warfare
 Scientific Revolution
 Age of Discovery
 Protestant Reformation
 Catholic Counter-Reformation
 Thirty Years' War
 Age of Enlightenment

References

Bibliography 
 
 
 John Coffey (2000), Persecution and Toleration in Protestant England 1558–1689, Studies in Modern History, Pearson Education
 Benjamin J. Kaplan (2007), Divided by Faith. Religious Conflict and the Practice of Toleration in Early Modern Europe. Cambridge University Press
 Joseph S. Freedman (1999), Philosophy and the Arts in Central Europe, 1500–1700: Teaching and Texts at Schools and Universities Aldershot: Ashgate

Further reading
 Black, Jeremy.  European International Relations, 1648–1815 (2002) 
 Blanning, T. C. W. The Culture of Power and the Power of Culture: Old Regime Europe 1660–1789 (2003)
 Cameron, Euan. Early Modern Europe: An Oxford History (2001)
 de Gouges, Linnea. Witch Hunts and State Building in Early Modern Europe Nisus Publications, 2017.
 de Vries, Jan. The Economy of Europe in an Age of Crisis, 1600–1750 (1976)
 de Vries, Jan. European Urbanization, 1500–1800 (1984)
 Dewald, Jonathan. "The Early Modern Period." in Encyclopedia of European Social History, edited by Peter N. Stearns, (vol. 1: 2001), pp. 165–177. online
 Dorn, Walter L. Competition For Empire 1740–1763 (1940) online
 DuPlessis, Robert S. Transitions to capitalism in early modern Europe (2019).
 Flinn, Michael W. The European Demographic System, 1500–1820 (1981)
 Gatti, Hilary. Ideas of Liberty in Early Modern Europe (2015).
 Gershoy, Leo. From Despotism To Revolution: 1763–1789 (1944) online
 Grafton, Anthony. Inky Fingers: The Making of Books in Early Modern Europe (2020).
 Gribben, Crawford, and Graeme Murdock, eds. Cultures of Calvinism in Early Modern Europe (Oxford UP, 2019).
 Gutmann, Myron P. Toward the Modern Economy: Early Industry in Europe, 1500–1800 (1988)
 Hesmyr, Atle: Scandinavia in the Early Modern Era(2017).
 Hill, David Jayne. A history of diplomacy in the international development of Europe (3 vol. 1914) online
 Jacob, Margaret C. Strangers nowhere in the world: the rise of cosmopolitanism in early modern Europe (2017).
 Kennedy, Paul. The rise and fall of the great powers (2010).
 Klein, Alexander, and Jelle Van Lottum. "The Determinants of International Migration in Early Modern Europe: Evidence from the Maritime Sector, c. 1700–1800." Social Science History 44.1 (2020): 143–167 online.
 Langer, William. An Encyclopedia of World History (5th ed. 1973), very detailed outline
 Levine, David. "The Population of Europe: Early Modern Demographic Patterns." in Encyclopedia of European Social History, edited by Peter N. Stearns, (vol. 2, 2001), pp. 145–157. online
 Lindsay, J. O. ed. New Cambridge Modern History: The Old Regime, 1713–1763 (1957) online
 Merriman, John. A History of Modern Europe: From the Renaissance to the Present (3rd ed. 2009, 2 vol), 1412 pp.
 Mowat, R. B. History of European Diplomacy, 1451–1789 (1928) 324 pp. online free
 Nussbaum, Frederick L. The triumph of science and reason, 1660–1685 (1953), Despite the narrow title is a general survey of European history.
 Parker, Geoffrey. The Military Revolution: Military Innovation and the Rise of the West, 1500–1800 (1996)
 Petrie, Charles. Earlier diplomatic history, 1492–1713 (1949), covers all of Europe; online
 Petrie, Charles. Diplomatic History, 1713–1933 (1946), broad summary online
 Pollmann, Judith. Memory in early modern Europe, 1500–1800 (Oxford UP, 2017).
 Rice, Eugene F. The Foundations of Early Modern Europe, 1460–1559 (2nd ed. 1994) 240 pp.
 Schroeder, Paul. The Transformation of European Politics 1763–1848 (1994) online; advanced diplomatic history 
 Scott, Hamish, ed. The Oxford Handbook of Early Modern European History, 1350–1750: Volume I: Peoples and Place (2015); Volume II: Cultures and Power (2015).
 "The State Church in Early-Modern Europe." in Arts and Humanities Through the Eras, edited by Edward I. Bleiberg, et al., (vol. 5: The Age of the Baroque and Enlightenment 1600–1800, Gale, 2005), pp. 336–341. online
 Stearns, Peter N., ed. Encyclopedia of European Social History (6 vol 2000), 3000 pp; overview vol. 1 pp. 165–77, plus hundreds of articles
 Tallett, Frank. War and Society in Early Modern Europe: 1495–1715 (2016).
 Wiesner, Merry E. Early Modern Europe, 1450–1789 (Cambridge History of Europe) (2006)
 Wiesner-Hanks, Merry E. Women and gender in early modern Europe (Cambridge UP, 2019).
 Wolf, John B. The Emergence of the Great Powers, 1685–1715 (1951) online

External links

 Discussion of the medieval/modern transition, from the introduction to the pioneering Cambridge Modern History (1903)
 Society for Renaissance Studies

History of Europe by period
Western culture